Georg Pfeffer (17 January 1943 — 20 May 2020) was a German anthropologist. Born in 1943 in Berlin to a German sociologist father and a British mother, he was schooled in Hamburg. In 1959, he moved to Lahore with his family, and studied at the city's Forman Christian College for 3 years. Later, he moved back to Germany and studied at the University of Freiburg where he also completed his Ph.D. 

He served for 1 year as lecturer and for nearly 6 years as a professor of ethnology at the Heidelberg University. Later, he joined the Free University of Berlin and served as a professor at its Institute of Ethnology for nearly 23 years until his retirement in 2008. He had done fieldwork among the Adivasis of India's central regions, and in the eastern state Odisha. He also did field research in Pakistan. He was a co-founder of the European Association of Social Anthropologists and had worked at various editorial positions in a few anthropological journals. He died at the age of 77 years after a grave illness.

Early life and family
Georg Pfeffer was born on 17 January 1943 at Berlin in Germany to Karl Heinz Pfeffer and Margaret Wainman Kirby. His father was a sociologist. His mother was a Briton. He had to leave his native place because of bombing during the second world war's end. During his early childhood years, he lived in village in Hesse where he came in touch with refugees and experienced the "social structures" of Germany's countryside areas. In 1949, the Pfeffer family shifted to Hamburg where he completed his schooling.

Education
When Georg Pfeffer was 16 years old, the Pfeffer family shifted to Lahore in Pakistan. From 1959 to 1962, he studied at the Forman Christian College. During that time, he also learned about the culture, society, and language of Pakistan. Later, he returned to Germany. In 1966, he started to study history of religion, sociology, and ethnology at the University of Freiburg. His teachers at the university included Rolf Herzog and Heinrich Popitz. In 1970, he completed his Ph.D. at the university. For his doctorate, he presented a monographic dissertation titled Pariagruppen des Pandschab (Pariah Groups of Punjab).

Academic career and research
The subjects of Pfeffer's research included the study of power relations, anthropology of kinship, and anthropology of religion. He carried out field studies in India and Pakistan since 1968. He had studied the indigenous social groups and caste system of India and Pakistan. In the later half of the 1960s, he did his first ethnographic field study, and the subjects of the study were Lahore's "untouchable sweepers".

In 1971, he joined the South Asia Institute of Heidelberg University as an assistant. In the 1970s, he also performed his career's second field study on the role of the Vedic Brahmins in Jagannath Temple at Puri in Odisha, India. In Odisha, he had done fieldwork solely at the beginning. Later, he conducted research there with a group of scholars from India and Germany. He had been among the people of Odisha nearly each year for a few decades.

At the Heidelberg University, he also presented a monographic thesis titled Puris Sasana–Dörfer, Basis einer Regionalen Elite (Puris Sasana Villages, Basis of Regional Elite) for his habilitation in 1976, and worked as a lecturer at the university in 1978. From 1979 to 1985, he worked as a professor of ethnology at the Heidelberg University. From 1985 to his retirement in 2008, he worked as a professor at the Free University of Berlin's Institute of Social and Cultural Anthropology and also supervised the Asian studies at the institute. Since the 1980s, central India's Adivasi people had been the main focus of his field research, specially the study of their kinship, rituals, and religion. From 1984 to 1988, he was the co-editor of the South Asian Social Scientist. In 1989, he co-founded the European Association of Social Anthropologists.

Since 1990, he was a member of the editorial staff of the Zeitschrift für Ethnologie for its South Asia and Symbolic Classification subject. From 1993 to 1995, he along with Bernhard Hänsel, served as the co-editor for the publications of the Berliner Gesellschaft für Anthropologie, Ethnologie und Urgeschichte. Between 1996 and 2006, he headed the Deutsche Forschungsgemeinschaft-funded Schwerpunktprogramm Orissa at the Institute of Ethnology of the Free University of Berlin under which a number of long-term research projects were executed in the state. He was also an associate fellow of the University of Groningen's Centre for the Study of Religion and Culture in Asia for its 2 research projects — Religion, Culture and Society of Indian "Tribal" and Communities and History and Theory of the Anthropology of India.

Peter Berger noted that Pfeffer compared "worldviews and social structures" of the American, Australian and Central Indian autochthonous peoples. According to Berger, Pfeffer's "most important contribution lies in his comparative endeavor, as he worked out the general patterns of social structure and ideology that are shared by the various Central Indian indigenous peoples and at the same time constitute different distinctive cultural sub-complexes."

From 1993 to 1995 Pfeffer was the President of the Berlin Society for Anthropology, Ethnology and Prehistory.

Other interests
Pfeffer was also interested in literature, art, music, sports, and the current political events.

Death
Pfeffer died on 20 May 2020 at the age of 77 because of severe illness.

Works
Pfeffer wrote 4 monographs, 93 research papers, 22 reviews, 12 serials and 13 other miscellanea.

Books
Some of the books authored by Pfeffer are as follows:

Selected papers

See also
Christoph von Fürer-Haimendorf
Paul Hockings
Stephen Fuchs

Notes

References

Further reading

1943 births
People from Berlin
Forman Christian College alumni
University of Freiburg alumni
Academic staff of Heidelberg University
Academic staff of the Free University of Berlin
Social anthropologists
German anthropologists
Anthropology educators
Anthropology writers
21st-century anthropologists
2020 deaths